Kabilas is a former village development committee in Chitwan District Now a part of Bharatpur Metropolitan City in the Bagmati Province of southern Nepal. At the time of the 1991 Nepal census it had a population of 5,513.

References

Populated places in Chitwan District